Abel's Island is a 1988 American short animated film directed by Michael Sporn. It is based on the children's novel Abel's Island by William Steig. It was nominated for an Emmy Award in 1989 for Primetime Emmy Award for Outstanding Animated Program.

Cast 
Tim Curry as Abel
Heidi Stallings as Amanda
Lionel Jeffries as Gower

Production
In 1988, Abel's Island was made into a 30-minute animated film, directed by Michael Sporn. Abel was voiced by Tim Curry, and Gower was voiced by Lionel Jeffries. In 1989, the movie won an Emmy Award for Most Outstanding Animated Film under an hour.

Crew 
 Book - William Steig
 Director/Screenplay/Producer - Michael Sporn
 Screenplay - Maxine Fisher
 Executive Producer - Giuliana Nicodemi
 Assistant Producer - Kit Hawkins
 Music - Arthur Custer
 Camera - Gary Becker and Wolf Ferro
 Film Editing - Gregory Perler
 Art Direction - Bridget Thorn
 Assistant Director - Robert Marianetti

Rendering Artists
 Ray Kosarin
 Sono Kuwayama
 Stephen Macquignon
 Betsy Bauer
 Laura Bryson
 George McClements
 Christine O'Neill
 Theresa Smythe
 Michael Wisniewski

Animators
 Michael Sporn
 Tissa David
 John R. Dilworth (Credited as John Dilworth)
 Steven Dovas
 Doug Compton
 Lisa Crafts

Conductor
 Arthur Custer

Assistant Animators
 George McClements
 Ray Kosarin
 Michael Wisniewski

Background Artists
 Bridget Thorn

Animatic
 Thomas Repasky

Pencil Test
Daniel Estermen

References

External links
 
 

American animated short films
1988 films
1988 animated films
1980s animated short films
1980s American animated films
Animated films based on novels
Films set on fictional islands
1980s English-language films